Adam Wójcik (20 April 1970 – 26 August 2017) was a Polish professional basketball player. He was known as one of the all-time greats in Polish basketball. He is the second all-time leading scorer of the Polish Basketball League, with 10,087 points scored.

Professional career
On club level, he played in his native Poland, and also in Belgium, Greece, Italy and Spain. He is second in the all-time list of games played in the Polish League, with a total of 651, and points scored, with 10,087 points.

He was a three-time Polish League MVP, and also the finals MVP in 1998, 2001, and 2005. He won eight Polish League championships, two Polish Cups, and he was also a Belgian League champion, in 1997.

Wojcik made his EuroLeague debut in 2001, with Peristeri of Greece, the first of his six consecutive seasons in the competition. In his debut season, 2001–02, he was the EuroLeague's eighth-best scorer, with 18.4 points per game. Next, he made one-year stops at Unicaja Malaga and Śląsk Wrocław, before spending three seasons in a row with Prokom Trefl Sopot, and leading the team to the EuroLeague Top 16 twice. He finished his EuroLeague career with a 10.8 points per game scoring average, for a total of 1,030 points, over 95 games. He subsequently played one season in the second tier level EuroCup, in the 2009–10 season, with Turów Zgorzelec of Poland. He retired in 2012.

National team career
With the senior Polish national basketball team, Wojcik played in 149 games, the second most in the Polish national team's history, and he scored 1,821 points. He played at four EuroBasket's - 1991, 1997, 2007, and 2009.

Death
On 26 August 2017, Wojcik died at the age of 47, of leukemia.

Awards and accomplishments

Club career
 8× Polish League champion: 1995, 1998–2001, 2005–2007
 Polish Cup winner: 2004, 2006
 2× Polish Supercup winner: 1999, 2000
 Belgian League Champion: 1997

Individual awards
 3× PLK Most Valuable Player: 1998, 2001, 2005
 3× PLK Finals MVP: 1998, 2001, 2005
 9× All-PLK Team: 1990–1993, 1995, 1998, 1999, 2001, 2005
 10× PLK All-Star: 1994, 1995, 1998–2001, 2004–2006, 2009
 2× PLK All-Star Game MVP: 1999, 2009
 Greek League All-Star: 2002

References

External links
Adam Wójcik at acb.com 
Adam Wójcik at euroleague.net
Adam Wójcik at fiba.com
Adam Wójcik at legabasket.it 
Adam Wójcik at plk.pl 

1970 births
2017 deaths
Asseco Gdynia players
BC Oostende players
Baloncesto Málaga players
Centers (basketball)
Liga ACB players
MKS Znicz Basket Pruszków players
Orlandina Basket players
People from Oława
Peristeri B.C. players
Polish men's basketball players
Power forwards (basketball)
Recipients of the Order of Polonia Restituta
Śląsk Wrocław basketball players
Spirou Charleroi players
Trefl Sopot players
Turów Zgorzelec players
Deaths from cancer in Poland
Deaths from leukemia